Navicent Health Baldwin, formerly known as Oconee Regional Medical Center, is a 140-bed hospital in Milledgeville, Georgia. It serves the three areas of Baldwin, Hancock, and Wilkinson counties.

History 
In 1953, a bond referendum was held in Baldwin County which favored the issuance of hospital bonds. Additional required funds for hospital construction were obtained subsequently from the Federal and State Governments through provisions of the Hill-Burton Act, and the Commission of Roads and Revenue of Baldwin County established the Baldwin County Hospital Authority under the 1941 Georgia Hospital Authorities Law. The eighty bed Baldwin County Hospital facility was constructed at a cost of approximately $1,200,000 and formally opened on March 6, 1957. It was dedicated by Governor Marvin Griffin. The first patients admitted to the new facility were transferred from Richard Binion Clinic and Scott Hospital.

In 1961, forty-six beds and the intensive care unit were added, and in 1969, a major expansion program was instituted, including one entire three-story wing and another two-story addition to an existing wing. The cobalt therapy suite was added at this time, as were fifty-two private patient rooms, and extensive remodelling was done throughout the facility.

A Certificate of Need (CON) was obtained in 1979 to provide for modernization, renovation and expansion of ancillary services. At that time, bed capacity was reduced from 183 to 160. The Operating Suite, ICU Suite, Emergency Department and other ancillary areas, and the Lab and Radiology departments were also enlarged and modernized.

In January 1990, a management contract was signed with Hospital Management Professionals, Inc. Because of the expansion of services and the expansion of the area served, the named was officially changed to Oconee Regional Medical Center on October 1, 1992.

In 2000, ORMC opened Park Tower which added a new four floor tower to the existing hospital. This area is home to the Education Center, Cardiopulmonary, Surgical Suites, Same Day Surgery, Ambulatory Care, Outpatient Lab, Administration, A Place for Women (Women's Center), Pediatrics and the Post-Surgical Unit.

In 2007, the hospital will begin a project to upgrade the equipment in the Cancer Treatment Center. This endeavor will be partially funded by Oconee Regional Healthcare Foundation.

In 2017, management and the board of directors filed for bankruptcy protection. On October 1, 2017, Navicent Health Inc purchased Oconee Regional and changed the hospital's name to Navicent Health Baldwin.

On February 8, 2018 it was announced that Navicent Health would merge with North Carolina based healthcare system Atrium Health. They announced on December 20, 2018 that the agreement combining the two organizations had been signed, with Atrium being the controlling party.

On September 23, 2020, Navicent Health Baldwin opened a new Helipad close to the Emergency Room. Todd Dixon, the CEO of Navicent Health Baldwin announced on November 18, 2020 that the name of the hospital will change once again, to Atrium Health Navicent Baldwin.

EMS 
ORMC's Emergency medical services were contracted to The Medical Center of Central Georgia located in Macon, Georgia. This transition occurred on July 22, 2007.

Oconee Regional offered a contract to Grady EMS of Atlanta in June 2016, to take effect 1 October of that year, taking over from Navicent Health.

References 

Hospital buildings completed in 1957
Hospitals in Georgia (U.S. state)
Buildings and structures in Baldwin County, Georgia
Atrium Health